Padam may refer to:

Padam... Padam..., a song by Édith Piaf
Padam, Ladakh, India
Padam people, of India
Padam (musical composition), in Carnatic music
Southern Command (Israel) (Pikud Darom)